Following are the results of the 1950 Soviet Top League football championship.  Nineteen teams took part in the competition, with CDKA Moscow winning the championship.

League standings

Results

Top scorers
34 goals
 Nikita Simonyan (Spartak Moscow)

25 goals
 Avtandil Gogoberidze (Dinamo Tbilisi)

23 goals
 Boris Chuchelov (Dynamo Leningrad)

22 goals
 Konstantin Beskov (Dynamo Moscow)
 Anatoli Korotkov (Zenit Leningrad)

21 goals
 Boris Koverznev (CDKA Moscow)

19 goals
 Vladimir Dyomin (CDKA Moscow)

18 goals
 Vyacheslav Solovyov (CDKA Moscow)

17 goals
 Aleksandr Gulevsky (Krylia Sovetov Kuybyshev)

16 goals
 Viktor Shuvalov (VVS Moscow)
 Vasili Trofimov (Dynamo Moscow)

References

 Soviet Union - List of final tables (RSSSF)

1950
1
Soviet
Soviet